Ring of Spies (also known as Ring of Treason) is a 1964 British spy film directed by Robert Tronson and starring Bernard Lee, William Sylvester and Margaret Tyzack. It is based on the real-life case of the Portland Spy Ring, whose activities prompted "Reds under the bed" scare stories in the British popular press in the early 1960s.

Plot
Harry Houghton, a dissatisfied and alcoholic embassy attaché, disgraces himself at an official garden party in Warsaw, Poland. Knowing he is to be disciplined the following day, he says goodbye to his girlfriend, who reports back to the Russian embassy about his inevitable return to England. Despite a poor report from his previous superiors, Houghton is posted to the top secret Admiralty Underwater Weapons Establishment at Portland, a Royal Navy equipment testing facility. Houghton is soon approached by secret Soviet intelligence to hand over documents to them, as he apparently had in Warsaw, with the veiled threat of blackmail. He agrees to do so, but for pay. He begins an affair with a fellow records clerk, "Bunty" Gee. Gee has access to more important secret documents, and is groomed by Houghton and his new handler Alex (Gordon Lonsdale). Together, the couple begin to procure top secret documents for Soviet intelligence for money. When a fellow officer at the base receives poison pen letters, the shortlist of possible suspects includes Houghton. As a matter of routine, Houghton is followed by the security services, who find his high-spending habits suspicious. They plant listening devices in his house, and hear Alex's name mentioned as a source of funds. The couple, Alex, as well as Peter and Helen Kroger who transmitted the information to Russia are arrested, and sentenced at the Old Bailey. The film carries a pre-title prologue about the history of spying, and an epilogue warning cinemagoers that there could be spies in the auditorium, possibly in the very row from which they are watching the film.

Cast

 Bernard Lee as Henry Houghton
 William Sylvester as Gordon Lonsdale
 Margaret Tyzack as Elizabeth Gee
 David Kossoff as Peter Kroger
 Nancy Nevinson as Helen Kroger
 Thorley Walters as Cmdr. Winters
 Philip Latham as Captain Ray 
 Cyril Chamberlain as Anderson 
 Justine Lord as Christina 
 Patrick Barr as Captain Warner 
 Derek Francis as Chief Supt. Croft
 Paul Eddington as Partygoer
 Gillian Lewis as Marjorie Shaw 
 Richard Marner as Colonel Monat 
 Hector Ross as Supt. Woods 
 André Mikhelson as Russian Embassy official
 Garry Marsh as 1st Member at Lord's 
 Basil Dignam as 2nd Member at Lord's
 Geoffrey Palmer as Police Officer 
 Brian Nissen as Portland official
 Edwin Apps as Blake 
 Fred Griffiths as News vendor
 Bryan Pringle as Stakeout P.C.
 Anita West as Tilly

Production
It was shot at Shepperton Studios and on location around London including many of the sites involved in the real case. The film's sets were designed by Norman Arnold.

Release
The film was made just after the trial in 1961 but its release was delayed for legal reasons.

Sidney Gilliat said the film received a limited release due to fear of prosecution.

It was re-released in 1970 after the release of Harry Houghton and Ethel Gee from prison.

Reception

Critical reception
TV Guide gave the film 2.5 out of 5 stars. Its reviewer wrote that the film "concentrates on factual evidence leading up to the crack in the case. Lending an air of authenticity, shots of the actual spies appear in the opening frames," and concluded that "despite the documentary flavour, there are a few witty touches by the hand of Tronson"; while David Parkinson in the Radio Times gave it 3 out of 5 stars, and felt "the docudramatic style rather undermines director Robert Tronson's attempts to build suspense," but "Frank Launder proved himself to be just as capable of turning out a nail-biting thriller, as he was of crafting a chortle-worthy comedy. For once, separated from his usual partner, Sidney Gilliat (although the latter's brother Leslie acted as producer), Launder and co-writer Peter Barnes capably retell the story of the Portland spy ring."

Box office
The film did not perform well in its initial release.

References

Bibliography
 Shaw, Tony. British Cinema and the Cold War: The State, Propaganda and Consensus. I.B.Tauris, 2006.

External links

 

1964 films
1960s spy films
British spy films
Cold War spy films
Films set in London
Films shot in London
Films set in Dorset
Films set in Warsaw
Films directed by Robert Tronson
British Lion Films films
Films shot at Shepperton Studios
1960s English-language films
1960s British films